Rita Akpan  (born 28 September 1944) is a Nigerian teacher who was Federal Minister of Women affairs in the cabinet of President Olusegun Obasanjo between July 2003 and June 2005.

Background

Rita Akpan was born on 28 September 1944 in Akwa-Ibom State. She earned a Bachelor of Arts Degree in Languages and a Master of Art in Education from the University of Oregon, Eugene, USA.

Career 
From 1968 to 1986, Rita worked with the American International School, Victoria Island, Lagos and the Federal Ministry of Education. She served as Head of French Department, Federal Government Girls' College, Calabar, Federal Inspector of French Language and later as Vice Principal, Federal Government Girls College, Calabar.

Akpan was once a secretary to the Akwa Ibom State Government during the first tenure of the Governor Victor Attah administration. She was also a cabinet member during the first civilian administration of 
She was appointed Special Adviser on Information and Culture to the Akwa-Ibom State Governor in 1992.  She also served as State Commissioner for Education in 1993 and Secretary to State Government, Akwa-Ibom State, between 1999 and 2000.

Minister of Women Affairs

In October 2004, during a workshop on the socio-economic implications of human trafficking and child labour, Akpan noted that Nigeria was the first and only country in West Africa to enact an anti-human trafficking act.
In January 2005, Akpan introduced the second periodic report on Nigeria to the United Nations Committee on the Rights of the Child. She said Nigeria had taken concrete steps toward the Rights of the Child Convention since it had presented its initial report.

She was reported to have fallen from favor with President Obasanjo as being an associate of Akwa Ibom Governor Victor Attah, with whom Obasanjo had a disagreement.
She was dropped from the cabinet in June 2005.

References

1944 births
Living people
People from Akwa Ibom State
Federal ministers of Nigeria
21st-century Nigerian politicians
21st-century Nigerian women politicians
Women government ministers of Nigeria